Nilaparvata is a genus of planthoppers in the subfamily Delphacinae and tribe Delphacini Leach, 1815.

Species are widely distributed in the Americas, Africa, tropical Asia and Australia.  The type species, Nilaparvata lugens, also known as the 'brown planthopper', is a major pest of rice crops.

Species 
Fulgoromorpha Lists On the Web includes the following:
 Nilaparvata albotristriata (Kirkaldy, 1907)
 Nilaparvata angolensis Synave, 1959
 Nilaparvata bakeri (Muir, 1917)
 Nilaparvata caldwelli Metcalf, 1955
 Nilaparvata camilla Fennah, 1969
 Nilaparvata chaeremon Fennah, 1975
 Nilaparvata diophantu Fennah, 1958
 Nilaparvata gerhardi (Metcalf, 1923)
 Nilaparvata lugens (Stål, 1854) – type species
 Nilaparvata maeander Fennah, 1958
 Nilaparvata muiri China, 1925
 Nilaparvata myersi Muir, 1923
 Nilaparvata nigritarsis Muir, 1926
 Nilaparvata oryzae (Matsumura, 1907)
 Nilaparvata seminula Melichar, 1914
 Nilaparvata serrata Caldwell, 1951
 Nilaparvata terracefrons Guo & Liang, 2005
 Nilaparvata wolcotti Muir & Giffard, 1924

References

External links

Auchenorrhyncha genera
Delphacinae
Hemiptera of Asia
Hemiptera of Africa